The Lakson Group is a Pakistani conglomerate company which is  based in Karachi, Sindh, Pakistan. It was founded in 1954 and is owned by Lakhani family. The conglomerate is based in Karachi, currently chaired by Iqbal Ali Lakhani and was founded in 1954.

The company is very diversified and has its interests in agri-business, call centers, consumer non-durables, fast food, financial services, media, paper and board, printing and packaging, surgical instruments, technology (data-networking, BPO, and software) and travel.

Lakson Group of Companies

Technology
Cybernet, internet, and data communication network service provider
StormFiber, Internet, and television service provider
Sybrid (Private) Limited, business process outsourcing
Lakson Business Solutions Limited, IT provider
Ice Animations, VFX, and animation

Media
 Express News, Urdu-language TV news channel
 Express 24/7, English- 24-hours TV news channel (now closed down)
 Express Entertainment, Urdu-language Entertainment channel
 The Daily Express, No. 2 Urdu daily in Pakistan
 The Express Tribune, English-language newspaper
 Century Publications, incorporated in 1998, publishes Urdu and Sindhi daily newspapers Express and  Daily Sindh Express
 Tribune 24/7, English- 24-hours TV news channel

Financial Services
NayaPay, digital wallet and payment system.
Century Insurance Company Limited, general insurance business
Lakson Investments Limited, Pakistan's largest independent asset manager

Paper & Board
Century Paper and Board Mills Limited, producer of packaging boards in Pakistan
Merit Packaging Limited, printing and packaging company

Lakson Group joint-ventures
Lakson Group has alliances with the following major international companies:
Colgate-Palmolive Pakistan, manufacture and sale of detergents, personal care, and other related products in Pakistan
McDonald's Pakistan, 53 restaurants in major cities of Pakistan
Ajinomoto Lakson Pakistan (Private) Limited, produces seasonings, cooking oils, TV dinners, sweeteners, amino acids, and pharmaceuticals
Princeton Travels (Private) Limited, an IATA accredited travel agency and an active member of International travel forums like ASTA, PATA, UFTAA & TAAP
Fly Jinnah, a joint venture between Lakson Group and Air Arabia. It adopts the low cost model similar to that of Air Arabia.

See also
 List of companies of Pakistan

References

External links

 
Conglomerate companies of Pakistan
Companies based in Karachi
Conglomerate companies established in 1954
Pakistani companies established in 1954
Mass media companies established in 1954